Juan Berthy "Chicho" Suárez (born June 24, 1969) is a Bolivian former football striker.

His former clubs are Blooming, Guabirá, MLS team D.C. United, The Strongest and Oriente Petrolero. He finished his career with a second spell in The Strongest.

He also played for the Bolivia national team between 1991 and 1999, scoring 8 goals in 28 games.

Honours

References

RSSSF Topscorers

1969 births
Living people
Sportspeople from Santa Cruz de la Sierra
Bolivian footballers
Bolivia international footballers
Bolivian expatriate footballers
1991 Copa América players
1995 Copa América players
Bolivian Primera División players
Club Blooming players
D.C. United players
Major League Soccer players
Oriente Petrolero players
The Strongest players
Guabirá players
Expatriate soccer players in the United States
Bolivian expatriate sportspeople in the United States
Association football forwards